The Empty Closet is a free magazine published by the Out Alliance based in Rochester, New York. The Empty Closet reports on issues of interest to the local and national LGBT and allied communities.

History
The Empty Closet began publication in January 1971 by the University of Rochester Gay Liberation Front student group. Some of the founding members were Bob Osborn, Larry Fine, RJ Alcalá, Marshall Goldman, Debbie Lestz, Pattie Evans (her pseudonym during the early publications was Patricia Evers), Karen Hagberg, and Sue Minor. It is one of the longest continually published newspapers in the United States focusing on the LGBT community. It was a newspaper until February 2018.

Importance
In February 2011, the New York State Senate passed Resolution K130-2011, "Commemorating the 40th Anniversary of The Empty Closet", noting the contributions of the newspaper to creating an atmosphere of social tolerance in the Rochester region: "This progressive paper has been a powerful tool in documenting the social, political, religious, cultural, artistic, business and literary history and events for the GLBT community of Rochester and surrounding areas."

In 2013, a complete run of The Empty Closet was transferred to the Smithsonian National Museum of American History Archives for preservation.

References

External links
 The Empty Closet official website
 The Empty Closet archives  Rare Books, Special Collections and Preservation department of the Rush Rhees Library at the University of Rochester

LGBT culture in New York (state)
LGBT-related magazines published in the United States
Mass media in Rochester, New York
Monthly magazines published in the United States
Magazines established in 1971
Magazines published in New York (state)
Free magazines